Sevenia amulia, the lilac tree nymph, is a butterfly in the family Nymphalidae. It is found in Nigeria, Cameroon, Gabon, the Republic of the Congo, the Democratic Republic of the Congo, Angola, Zambia and Botswana. The habitat consists of forests, especially near marshy areas.

Adults are on wing year round. It is a migratory species.

The larvae feed on Maprouna membranacea and Sapium species (including S. ellipticum).

Subspecies
Sevenia amulia amulia (Nigeria, Cameroon, Gabon, Congo, central and northern Democratic Republic of the Congo)
Sevenia amulia intermedia (Carcasson, 1961) (Angola, north-western Zambia, Botswana, Democratic Republic of the Congo: Shaba, Lualaba, Lomami, Maniema and Sankuru)

References

Butterflies described in 1777
amulia